The Liga Nayarit de Béisbol is a twelve-team baseball league in the Mexican state of Nayarit.  Founded in 2000, it was a winter affiliate of the Mexican League.

Teams

Champions

Liga de Béisbol del Noroeste de México

Liga Nayarit de Béisbol

Liga Nayarit de Béisbol Championships by team

Defunct teams

External links
 Liga de Beisbol del Noroeste de Mexico Official Site (Spanish)

Defunct baseball leagues in Mexico